Albert Edward Moore (born 1898) was an English footballer who played in the Football League for Stoke.

Career
Moore was born in Longton and played amateur football with Normacot before joining Stoke in 1921. He played one match in the Football League which came in a 1–0 defeat to Bradford Park Avenue during the 1921–22 season. He then returned to amateur status and played for Burslem Swifts.

Career statistics

References

English footballers
Stoke City F.C. players
English Football League players
1898 births
Year of death missing
Association football inside forwards